Kadeem is a given name. Notable people with the name include:

Kadeem Allen (born 1993), American basketball player for Hapoel Haifa in the Israeli Basketball Premier League
Kadeem Hardison, American actor
Kadeem Harris, English footballer

See also
Bilad Al Qadeem, town in Bahrain

Arabic masculine given names